Queen Jun (died 3rd century BC), was the Queen consort of King Xiang of Qi.

She was the daughter of an astrologer. She was known for her great influence over the affairs of state.

References 

3rd-century BC births
3rd-century BC deaths
3rd-century BC Chinese women
3rd-century BC Chinese people